Michael Staffurth Stancliffe (8 April 1916 – 26 March 1987) was a Church of England priest who served as the Dean of Winchester from 1969 to 1986.

Career
Stancliffe trained for ordination at Lincoln Theological College, and was ordained deacon in 1940 and priest in 1941. and was a curate at St James', Southbroom, Devizes 1940–43  before becoming the priest in charge at Ramsbury 1943–44 and then curate of Cirencester and priest-in-charge of Holy Trinity, Watermoor, 1944–49.

He was then a Master and Chaplain at Westminster School 1949–57 and also Preacher to Lincoln's Inn, 1954–57. Following this he was Rector of St Margaret's, Westminster, a Canon of Westminster Abbey 1957–69, and Speaker's Chaplain 1961–69 before his elevation to the Deanery of Winchester.

He was a member of General Synod 1970–80 and Chairman of the Council for Places of Worship, 1972–75; Fellow of Winchester College 1973. He was also considered for the post of Bishop of Carlisle.

Personal life
His son, David Stancliffe, was the Bishop of Salisbury. His daughter, Claire Stancliffe, is the author of research on the cult of St Martin and early Irish Christianity.

Notes

1916 births
People educated at Haileybury and Imperial Service College
Alumni of Trinity College, Oxford
Deans of Winchester
1987 deaths
Canons of Westminster